Uchechukwu Eberechukwu Nwaneri  (March 20, 1984 – December 30, 2022) was an American football guard who played in the National Football League (NFL) for seven seasons with the Jacksonville Jaguars. He played college football at Purdue and was selected by the Jaguars in the fifth round of the 2007 NFL Draft. After retiring, he ran "The Observant Lineman" channel on YouTube.

Early life
Nwaneri attended Naaman Forest High School in Garland, Texas, where he was teammates with Melvin Bullitt.

Nwaneri committed to Purdue University on July 8, 2003. Nwaneri also had FBS scholarship offers from Kentucky, and Texas A&M.

Professional career

Jacksonville Jaguars
Nwaneri saw limited action as a rookie during the Jaguars' 2007 playoff run, playing in 9 games with 1 start. The next season, he was elevated to starter after an injury to starting guard Vince Manuwai. In all, he appeared in 15 games during the 2008 season, starting 15 of them. He allowed 4.5 sacks during the season.

In 2009, Nwaneri and fellow guard Maurice Williams competed for the starting guard position opposite the returning Vince Manuwai. Nwaneri won the job; Williams was deactivated for much of the season before being released on December 5, 2009. Nwaneri appeared in all 16 games, starting 13 of them. He was only credited with allowing one-half of a sack. Nwaneri was also not penalized during the 2009 season.

Nwaneri was released on March 4, 2014.

Dallas Cowboys
Nwaneri signed with the Dallas Cowboys on June 25, 2014. He was cut during final roster cuts on August 30, 2014. Following this, he retired from the NFL.

Death
Nwaneri died on December 30, 2022. Preliminary results indicated a possible heart attack. He was 38.

References

External links
 Jacksonville Jaguars Bio 
 
 
 

1984 births
2022 deaths
American football offensive guards
American people of Igbo descent
American sportspeople of Nigerian descent
Igbo sportspeople
Commentary YouTubers
Dallas Cowboys players
Gaming YouTubers
Jacksonville Jaguars players
News YouTubers
Sports YouTubers
Video game commentators
Players of American football from Dallas
Purdue Boilermakers football players
African-American players of American football
YouTube channels launched in 2006
YouTubers from Texas
21st-century African-American sportspeople
20th-century African-American people